The Ryongsŏng Line is an electrified standard-gauge secondary line of the Korean State Railway in P'yŏngyang, North Korea, running from Sŏp'o on the P'yŏngŭi Line to Tongbungri on the P'yŏngra Line. From Ryongsŏng, this line also has a line connecting to the private railway station attached to Residence No. 55, the primary residence of Kim Jong-un. The maintenance facilities for the North Korean leaders' trains are also located at Ryongsŏng Station.

History
The line was originally opened by the Chosen Government Railway on 1 November 1927 as part of the first section of the former P'yŏngwŏn Line from Sŏp'o to Sainjang (nowadays called P'yŏngsŏng Station). After the establishment of the DPRK, the Korean State Railway created the P'yŏngra Line by merging the P'yŏngwŏn Line with parts of the Hamgyŏng and Ch'ŏngra lines, at which time the Sŏp'o—Tongbungri section of the former P'yŏngwŏn Line was separated to create the current Ryongsŏng Line.

Route
A yellow background in the "Distance" box indicates that section of the line is not electrified.

San'um Branch

Electrified.

References

 

Railway lines in North Korea
Standard gauge railways in North Korea
Railway lines opened in 1927